Zbigniew Ryszard Kozak (born 3 April 1961 in Gdynia) is a Polish politician. He was elected to the Sejm on 25 September 2005, getting 7,901 votes in 26 Gdynia district as a candidate from the  Law and Justice list.

See also
Members of Polish Sejm 2005-2007

External links
Zbigniew Kozak - parliamentary page - includes declarations of interest, voting record, and transcripts of speeches.

1961 births
Living people
People from Gdynia
Members of the Polish Sejm 2005–2007
Law and Justice politicians
Members of the Polish Sejm 2007–2011